Kuh Dim-e Pain (also Romanized as Kūh Dīm-e Pā’īn; also known as Kūh Dem) is a village in Polan Rural District, Polan District, Chabahar County, Sistan and Baluchestan Province, Iran. At the 2006 census, its population was 246 spread in 38 families.

References 

Populated places in Chabahar County